Amirabad-e Pain (also Romanized as Amīrābād-e Pā’īn and Amīrābād Pāīn; also known as Kalāteh-ye Khān) is a village in Baqeran Rural District, in the Central District of Birjand County, South Khorasan Province, Iran. At the 2016 census, its population was 7,177, in 1,847 families.

References 

Populated places in Birjand County